Thomas Newcomen (1693 – May 1782) was an Anglo-Irish politician.

He represented St Johnstown, County Longford, in the Irish House of Commons between 1727 and 1760.

References

1693 births
1782 deaths
18th-century Anglo-Irish people
Irish MPs 1727–1760
Members of the Parliament of Ireland (pre-1801) for County Longford constituencies
Newcomen family